Risa Tabata is a video game producer and director at Nintendo. She was a co-producer of Donkey Kong Country Returns, Donkey Kong Country: Tropical Freeze and Paper Mario: Color Splash. She was assistant producer on the Metroid Prime trilogy.

Early life 
Risa Tabata was born in Osaka and graduated from Osaka University.

Career 
Risa Tabata was an assistant producer on the Metroid Prime trilogy and said using the Wii Remote game play is intuitive.

She was a co-producer of Paper Mario: Color Splash. In contrast to a traditional Mario game, they focused on humor to do the stupidest, craziest things possible.

She was director for Donkey Kong Country Tropical Freeze, discussing the addition of Dixie as a partner character with extra lift when her ponytail whips around.

As assistant producer for Chibi-Robo! Zip Lash, she talked about development of the whip and swing mechanic. She said they can move forward with a game if they can see the fun element. She has worked on many other games.

References 

Women video game developers
Osaka University alumni
Nintendo people
Living people
Year of birth missing (living people)